Madonna and Child with Cherubs or The Virgin and the Child with Angels is an oil painting by Rosso Fiorentino, produced sometime between 1512 and 1517. Originally on panel, it was later transferred to canvas. It was acquired in 1810 in Paris with help from the baron Dominique Vivant Denon for the Hermitage Museum in St Petersburg, where it now hangs.

The composition draws on models by Fra Bartolomeo and the pyramidical group owes much to Michelangelo. It is also reminiscent of Fiorentino's own Assumption of the Virgin, first painted in 1512-1513 and retouched or repainted in 1517.

References

Paintings of the Madonna and Child
Paintings by Rosso Fiorentino
1510s paintings
Paintings in the collection of the Hermitage Museum
Angels in art